The  United Hatters, Cap and Millinery Workers International Union (1934–1983), also known by acronyms including UHCMW, U.H.C. & M.W.I.U. and UHC & MWIU, was a 20th-century American labor union.

History
In 1934, the United Hatters of North America (UHNA) (formed 1896) and the Cloth Hat, Cap and Millinery Workers International Union (CHCMW) (formed 1901), both based in New York, ended their competition by merging to form the United Hatters, Cap and Millinery Workers International Union (UHCMW).

In June 5, 1946, Congressional Quarterly reported how, in the wake of the Strike wave of 1945–1946 and February 1936 Case permanent strike control bill:    President Green of the A. F. L. called upon the President, June 3, to veto the Case (permanent) strike control bill which had been sent to the White House four days earlier. Unless this were done, he told the convention of the United Hatters, Cap and Millinery Workers at New York, "the 7,500,000 members of the A. F. L. will be rebels," and the A. F. L. will use its political strength "to elect men who will repeal this abhorrent legislation." In August 1948, UHCMW established a Hatters Union, Local No. 125 at the Texas-Miller Products.

UHCMW failed to get International Hat Company employees to join its union.

UHCMW was a member of the International Clothing Workers' Federation (IGWF), a global union federation representing workers involved in making and repairing clothes, as well as the International Textile and Garment Workers' Federation (ITGWF), also a global union federation of unions representing workers involved in manufacturing clothing and other textiles, and the International Textile, Garment and Leather Workers' Federation (ITGLWF), which in 1970 resulted from the merger of the International Textile and Garment Workers' Federation and the International Shoe and Leather Workers' Federation.

The hat and millinery trade went into decline in the US, and in 1983 UHCMW merged into the Amalgamated Clothing and Textile Workers Union (ACTWU).

Leaders

Presidents
1934: Michael F. Greene
1936: Max Zaritsky
1950: Alex Rose
1977: Nicholas Gyory

Secretary-Treasurers
1934: Max Zaritsky
1936: Michael F. Greene
1949: Marx Lewis
1956: Alex Rose
1965: Alfred Smoke
1970s: Gerald R. Coleman
1979: Nicholas Gyory

Other leaders
 Martin Lawlor: label secretary
 Carmen Lucia: vice president
 Alfred Braunthal: research director

Legacy
In 1995, ACTWU merged with the International Ladies Garment Workers Union to form UNITE (Union of Needletrades, Industrial and Textile Employees).

See also

 United Hatters of North America
 Amalgamated Clothing and Textile Workers Union
 International Ladies Garment Workers Union
 UNITE

References

Defunct trade unions in the United States
1934 establishments in the United States
1983 disestablishments in the United States
Textile and clothing trade unions
UNITE HERE
Hat makers' trade unions
Trade unions established in 1934
Trade unions disestablished in 1983